Gumi University is a university located in Gumi, North Gyeongsang, South Korea.

Notable alumni
 Choi Doo-ho - professional Mixed Martial Artist

External links

References

Gumi, North Gyeongsang
Private universities and colleges in South Korea
Universities and colleges in North Gyeongsang Province
Educational institutions established in 1992
1992 establishments in South Korea